Stefan Ålander (born 25 April 1983) is a retired Swedish footballer who lastly played for GIF Sundsvall as a defender.

References

External links
 
 
 

1983 births
Living people
Association football midfielders
Kalmar FF players
GIF Sundsvall players
Allsvenskan players
Superettan players
Swedish footballers
People from Sundsvall
Sportspeople from Västernorrland County